Mannoor  is a village in Irapuram, Kunnathunad, Ernakulam in the Indian state of Kerala. Mannoor is located 10 km away from Perumbavoor and Muvattupuzha.

References

Villages in Ernakulam district